Straight out the Jungle is the debut album from hip hop group Jungle Brothers. The album marked the beginning of the Native Tongues collective, which later featured popular artists such as De La Soul, A Tribe Called Quest and Black Sheep. The album's masters have a lower quality to other hip-hop albums of its kind, compared to the singles.

The single "I'll House You", added to the album in late-1988 reissues, is known as the first non-Chicago hip-house record to be a sufficiently big club hit, to drastically change how the hip-hop and dance-music industries work.

Reception

In 1998, Straight out the Jungle was selected as one of The Sources "100 Best Albums".

Track listing

Charts

Album

Singles

References

1988 debut albums
Albums produced by Q-Tip (musician)
Jungle Brothers albums
Warlock Records albums